The Super Super Blues Band is an album by blues musicians Howlin' Wolf, Muddy Waters and Bo Diddley released on the Checker label in 1968.

Reception

AllMusic reviewer Ken Chang stated "Wolf adamantly refuses to back down from his rivals, resulting in a flood of contentious studio banter that turns out to be more entertaining than the otherwise unmemorable music from this stylistic train wreck. Although Wolf and Waters duke it out in earnest on the blues standards, the presence of Diddley (and his rave-up repertoire) makes the prospect of an ensemble impossible; in the end, there are just too many clashing ingredients to make the mix digestible. ... At least it sounds like they had fun doing it".

Track listing 
 "Long Distance Call" (McKinley Morganfield) – 9:10
 "Medley: Ooh Baby / Wrecking My Love Life" (Ellas McDaniel / Clifton James, Kay McDaniel) – 6:28
 "Sweet Little Angel" (Robert Nighthawk) – 6:30
 "Spoonful" (Willie Dixon) – 4:10
 "Diddley Daddy" (McDaniel) – 5:10
 "The Red Rooster" (Dixon) – 7:20
 "Goin' Down Slow" (James B. Oden) – 4:47

Personnel 
Howlin' Wolf – vocals, guitar, harmonica
Muddy Waters – vocals, guitar
Bo Diddley – vocals, guitar
Otis Spann – piano
Hubert Sumlin – guitar
Buddy Guy – bass
Frank Kirkland – drums
Cookie Vee – vocals

References 

1968 albums
Howlin' Wolf albums
Muddy Waters albums
Bo Diddley albums
Checker Records albums
Collaborative albums